Iván Hernández may refer to:

 Iván Hernández (footballer) (born 1980), Spanish footballer
 Iván Hernández (boxer) (born 1982), Mexican boxer
 Iván Hernández González, Puerto Rican politician and former mayor of Vega Baja
 Iván Hernández (actor), actor in telenovelas such as Más sabe el diablo and Alguien Te Mira
 Iván Hernández (weightlifter) (born 1983), Spanish weightlifter